Neuilly sa mère, sa mère!, also known as Neuilly sa mère! 2, is a 2018 French comedy film directed by Gabriel Julien-Laferrière. This is the sequel of Neuilly Yo Mama! released in 2009.

UniFrance shows the English title Straight Outta Neuilly.

Plot
In 2008, Sami Benboudaoud discovered the hell of Neuilly-sur-Seine, Paris Region.

10 years later, while everything is going well for Sami, who brilliantly finishes his studies in political science, nothing is going well for his cousin Charles de Chazelle. Since the defeat of his idol Nicolas Sarkozy in the presidential elections, he has fallen into a deep depression when his family loses all their fortune and has to leave Neuilly. Rejected by all, the Chazelle find refuge at Sami in Nanterre. From then on, for Sami and the inhabitants of his city, life will never be a long calm river again.

Cast

Production
Principal photography on the film began on October 3, 2017, and lasted til the end of the year.

References

External links

2018 films
2018 comedy films
French comedy films
2010s French-language films
Films directed by Gabriel Julien-Laferrière
2010s French films